Header bidding is a programmatic advertising technique in which publishers bid on multiple advertising exchanges in real time. Google has been reported to have referred internally to header bidding as an "existential threat".

References 

Online advertising methods